ReplayGain is a proposed technical standard published by David Robinson in 2001 to measure and normalize the perceived loudness of audio in computer audio formats such as MP3 and Ogg Vorbis. It allows media players to normalize loudness for individual tracks or albums. This avoids the common problem of having to manually adjust volume levels between tracks when playing audio files from albums that have been mastered at different loudness levels.

Although this de facto standard is now formally known as ReplayGain, it was originally known as Replay Gain and is sometimes abbreviated RG.

ReplayGain is supported in a large number of media software and portable devices.

Operation
ReplayGain works by first performing a psychoacoustic analysis of an entire audio track or album to measure peak level and perceived loudness. Equal-loudness contours are used to compensate for frequency effects and statistical analysis is used to accommodate for effects related to time. The difference between the measured perceived loudness and the desired target loudness is calculated; this is considered the ideal replay gain value. Typically, the replay gain and peak level values are then stored as metadata in the audio file. ReplayGain-capable audio players use the replay gain metadata to automatically attenuate or amplify the signal on a per-track or per-album basis such that tracks or albums play at a similar loudness level. The peak level metadata can be used to prevent gain adjustments from inducing clipping in the playback device.

Metadata
The original ReplayGain proposal specified an 8-byte field in the header of any file. Most implementations now use tags for ReplayGain information. FLAC and Ogg Vorbis use the REPLAYGAIN_* Vorbis comment fields. MP3 files usually use ID3v2.  Other formats such as AAC and WMA use their native tag formats with a specially formatted tag entry listing the track's replay gain and peak loudness.

ReplayGain utilities usually add metadata to the audio files without altering the original audio data. Alternatively, a tool can amplify or attenuate the data itself and save the result to another, gain-adjusted audio file; this is not perfectly reversible in most cases. Some lossy audio formats, such as MP3, are structured in a way that they encode the volume of each compressed frame in a stream, and tools such as MP3Gain take advantage of this for directly applying the gain adjustment to MP3 files, adding undo information so that the process is reversible.

Target loudness
The target loudness of ReplayGain utilities is 89 dB sound pressure level. The SPL reference comes from a SMPTE recommendation used to calibrate playback levels in movie theaters.

A more common means of specifying a reference level is relative to a full-scale signal. ReplayGain nominally plays at -14 dB relative to full-scale leaving 14 dB of headroom for reproduction of dynamic material. In contrast, the SMPTE RP 200:2002, on which the ReplayGain reference was originally based, recommends 20 dB of headroom. The more recent EBU R 128 suggests 23 dB.

Track-gain and album-gain 
ReplayGain analysis can be performed on individual tracks, so that all tracks will be of equal volume on playback. Analysis can also be performed on a per-album basis. In album-gain analysis an additional peak-value and gain-value, which will be shared by the whole album, is calculated. Using the album-gain values during playback will preserve the volume differences among tracks on an album.

On playback, listeners may decide if they want all tracks to sound equally loud or if they want all albums to sound equally loud with different tracks having different loudness. In album-gain mode, when album-gain data is missing, players should use track-gain data instead.

Alternatives 
 Peak amplitude is not a reliable indicator of loudness, so consequently peak normalization does not offer reliable normalization of perceived loudness. RMS normalization is more accurate, but does not take into account psychoacoustic aspects of loudness perception.
 With dynamic range compression, volume may be altered on-the-fly on playback producing a variable-gain normalization, as opposed to the constant gain as rendered by ReplayGain. While dynamic range compression is beneficial in keeping volume constant, it changes the artistic intent of the recording.
 Sound Check is a proprietary Apple Inc. technology similar in function to ReplayGain. It is available in iTunes and on the iPod.
 Standard measurement algorithms for broadcast loudness monitoring applications have recently been developed by the International Telecommunication Union (ITU-R BS.1770) and the European Broadcasting Union (EBU R128).

Implementations

Audio players 

 AIMP, Windows, Android - can write and read
 Amarok, KDE desktop environment. Native ReplayGain support was added in Amarok 2.1.
 Audacious, Unix-like systems and Windows
 Aqualung Music Player, Linux and Windows
 Banshee, Linux
 Clementine, Windows, Mac OS X and Linux
 cmus, Unix-like systems
 Cue Broadcast Audio Player, Windows
 DeaDBeeF, Linux, *BSD, OpenSolaris and Mac OS X
 Exaile, Linux/GNOME desktop environment
 FLAC, the reference FLAC decoder can create a new copy with ReplayGain applied, through the undocumented option --apply-replaygain-which-is-not-lossless as of version 1.1.1
 foobar2000, Windows
 hunisPRO automation system, Windows
 JRiver Media Center, Windows
 JavaTunes, Windows, Linux and Mac OS X
 Kodi, cross-platform
 MediaMonkey, Windows
 Mixxx virtual DJ software, v1.9.0 and up
 madplay, Unix-like systems
 Mpg123, supported for only Xing/Lame/Info header
 mpv, multiplatform. Can read ReplayGain tags
 MPD, Unix-like systems
 Muine, GNOME desktop environment
 MusicBee, Windows
 Nightingale, Linux, Mac OS X, Windows
 Play, Mac OS X
 Pocket Player, Windows Mobile, through the ReplayGain DSP plugin
 ProppFrexx ONAIR, Windows
 Pulsar+, Android 
 Qmmp, cross-platform
 Quod Libet, Unix-like systems. Reads ReplayGain metadata natively. Has a plugin to analyze and write ReplayGain information.
 QuuxPlayer, Windows
 RadioBOSS, Windows radio automation software
 Rhythmbox, GNOME (through a plug-in)
 Songbird, Windows and Mac OS X
 SoX, cross-platform
 Squeezebox hardware and accompanying SlimServer/SqueezeCenter software from Slim Devices
 VLC media player, multiplatform. Reads ReplayGain metadata natively 
 Winamp, Windows
 XMMS, Unix-like systems with X11. Supports ReplayGain for Vorbis; for MP3 files, a patched version of the xmms-mad plugin which only supports APEv2 is available)
 XMMS2, Unix-like systems
 XMPlay, Windows
 Zortam Mp3 Media Studio, Windows

Portable media players 
 All devices with a working Rockbox port
 Sandisk Sansa Fuze and Sansa Clip+
 iPod through other programs that convert ReplayGain data to the Apple proprietary Sound Check format (e.g. iPod Manager for foobar2000, other alternatives elsewhere on this page)
Typical CD players and other legacy audio players do not support ReplayGain.

Android compatible players 
 DeaDBeeF
 foobar2000 for Android
 GoneMAD Music Player
 Neutron Music Player
 Muzio Player
MyTunes
 PowerAMP
 Vanilla Music
 Winamp PRO for Android
 Vinyl Music Player
 XenoAmp Music Player
 Musicolet Music Player Pro

Scanners 

 beaTunes: Writes the standard replaygain_track_gain/replaygain_track_peak tags and replaces the iTunNORM metadata tag value, which is used by iTunes software and iPod music players for Sound Check volume normalization.
 Ex Falso: Included plugin scans files on a per-album base, writes the standard tags into metadata.
 FLAC and metaflac: Encoder can optionally generate metadata. Tagger generates metadata.
 foobar2000: Generates metadata through included plugin using EBU R128 (but at old 89 dB levels) for all supported tag formats. 
 LAME: Encoder writes metadata to LAME tag
 MediaMonkey: Analyze Volume calculates RG values and writes them into the files as tags and into its library database
 MP3Gain: (open source) generates metadata. Can directly modify original file and write undo information as metadata.
 QuuxPlayer for Windows: calculates gain values and saves them in its library database; optionally writes ReplayGain tags to files with ID3v2 tags.
 Quod Libet: Based on Ex Falso. Generates metadata through included plugin to analyze and write ReplayGain information
 Rapid Evolution: Generates metadata
 soundKonverter: frontend for various audio conversion tools. Is built using KDE Development Platform and has a ReplayGain tool.
 Winamp: Generates metadata
 loudgain: A ReplayGain 2.0 loudness normalizer, based on the EBU R128/ITU BS.1770 standard (-18 LUFS) and supports FLAC/Ogg/MP2/MP3/MP4/M4A/ALAC/Opus/ASF/WMA/WAV/WavPack/AIFF/APE audio files. It uses the MP3gain command-line syntax but does not modify the actual audio data.

Streaming
Spotify

Notes

See also 
 Alignment level
 Dialnorm
 EBU R 128
 Loudness war

References

External links 
 ReplayGain specification
 ReplayGain at Hydrogenaudio wiki
 Replay Gain – A Proposed Standard, the original proposal, now out of date with respect to current practice
 Replay Gain in Linux — guide to using graphical and command line ReplayGain tools in Linux.

Computer standards
Digital audio